Andela is a global job placement network for software developers. Andela focuses on sustainable careers, connecting technologists with long-term engagements, access to international roles, competitive compensation, and career coaching through the Andela Learning Community.

History 
Andela was founded in 2014 by Jeremy Johnson, Iyinoluwa Aboyeji, Nadayar Enegesi, Brice Nkengsa, Ian Carnevale, and Christina Sass. In May 2014, Andela launched their first recruitment cycle in Lagos by putting their first call for applications on Twitter. The company hired their first cohort—four Nigerian software engineers—after receiving 700 applications for 4 spots. 

In 2018, Andela celebrated the first two sets of engineers to complete the four-year program.
 
In 2019, Christina Sass stepped down from her full-time role as President and transitioned into a supporting role as the Chair of the Andela Advisory Council and the Andela Alumni Group. Of the six original founders, Jeremy Johnson continues to work at Andela. 
 
While the initial route for engineers to join the company was via the Andela Fellowship, a four-year program geared towards junior engineers, this changed in 2019. Andela widened its hiring criteria for mid and senior-level engineers in Lagos, Nairobi, and Kampala. After their first remote expansions to Ghana and Egypt, the entire organization went fully remote in 2020. 
 
As of 2021, Andela provides technologists from six continents access to opportunities with global companies on long-term embedded contracts. Andela’s applicants can undertake training in software languages such as Ruby on Rails, JavaScript, Python, Ruby, React Native, Node, PHP, and more.

Funding 
On June 25, 2015, Andela secured $10 million in Series A funding. Spark Capital led the investment and many of the Seed investors participated.
 
The following year, The Chan Zuckerberg Initiative—founded and owned by Facebook founder Mark Zuckerberg and Priscilla Chan—led in Andela’s $24 million Series B round of funding, making it the first lead investment ever for the foundation.
 
In October 2017, Andela secured $40 million in Series C funding, bringing the total the company had raised to $80 million. The investment, led by CRE Venture Capital—a South African-based venture firm—is one of the largest investments to be led by an African venture firm into an African company.
 
In January 2019, Generation Investment Management, a sustainable investment management firm , led Andela's $100M Series D round of funding, bringing Andela’s total venture funding to $180M.The Series D also included Serena Williams’ investment platform, Serena Ventures.
 
On September 29, 2021, Andela announced $200M Investment led by Softbank Vision Fund 2 with participation from new investor Whale Rock and existing investors including Generation Investment Management, Chan Zuckerberg Initiative, and Spark Capital. Lydia Jett, founding partner at SoftBank Investment Advisers, joined Andela’s Board of Directors. The Series E financing valued the global engineering network at $1.5 billion.

References

External links
 

Coding schools
Privately held companies based in New York City